Renee Radcliff (born 1959) is a former American politician who served as a member of the Washington House of Representatives from 1995 to 2001.  She represented Washington's 21st legislative district as a Republican.

She surprised colleagues by resigning mid-term in 2001, setting up one of two special elections for seats in Snohomish County, the other being vacated by the death of Democrat Patricia Scott.  Democrats won both seats, breaking a tie in the chamber and resulting in a 50–48 Democratic majority that elected Frank Chopp as sole Speaker of the House.

References

1959 births
Living people
Republican Party members of the Washington House of Representatives
Women state legislators in Washington (state)